Linwood is an unincorporated community in Cherokee County, located in the U.S. state of Texas. According to the Handbook of Texas, the community had a population of 40 in 2000. It is located within the Tyler-Jacksonville combined statistical area.

History
Joseph Durst and his wife Delilah were the first settlers in Linwood sometime before 1832. Another community named Lockranzie developed a half mile east of the community, but the post office moved to Linwood in 1851. It was platted by James H. Durst and Ann Harrison Terrell, promoting it as a port along the Angelina River. Navigation along the river failed and the community grew sharply. Charles Chevallier, Henry Raguet and his brother (also named Charles) relocated here from Nacogdoches and opened stores here in the 1850s. Other early settlers included R.W. Mitchell, George Whitfield Terrell, and his son George B. Terrell. The Kansas and Gulf Short Line Railroad bypassed Linwood in the early 1880s, causing most of its businesses and residents to relocate to nearby Alto. The post office shut down in 1903 and the community had two businesses, a church, and ten residents in 1936. The last businesses closed, and the population went up to 40 from 1990 through 2000.

Geography

Education
Linwood had its own school in 1936. Today, the community is served by the Alto Independent School District.

Notes

Unincorporated communities in Cherokee County, Texas
Unincorporated communities in Texas